A list of notable psychiatrists and psychologists from Slovenia:

Psychologists

G 
 Christian Gostečnik

P 
 Vid Pečjak

Š 
 Marjan Šetinc

T 
 Anton Trstenjak

 
 
Psycho